Ria Schröder (born 7 March 1992) is a German politician of the Free Democratic Party (FDP) who has been a member of the Bundestag since 2021. 

Schröder was the federal chairwoman of the FDP-affiliated youth organization Young Liberals (Junge Liberale) from 2018 to 2020. Since 2019, she has been an assessor on the federal executive committee of the FDP.

Education 
From 2010, Schröder studied law at Bucerius Law School in Hamburg, graduating with the first state exam in 2016. Since 2016, she has been studying art history and Italian at the University of Hamburg and working at a Hamburg law firm.

Political career 
Schröder has been a member of the Hamburg state executive committee of the FDP since 2014, a member of the federal executive committee of the Young Liberals since 2015 and became federal chairwoman of the FDP-affiliated youth association on 27 April 2018. She prevailed over an opposing candidate at the 56th federal congress of the Young Liberals in Gütersloh with 58.08 percent of the votes cast. Schröder succeeded Konstantin Kuhle, who did not stand for re-election as chairman following his election to the German Bundestag. Previously, she was deputy state chair for organization of the Young Liberals Hamburg from 2014 to 2016, as well as first assessor and later deputy federal chair for organization in the federal executive committee. At the 2019 federal congress, she was re-elected with 56.6 percent without opposing candidates. After Schröder announced that she would not run again after two years as federal chairwoman of the Young Liberals, Jens Teutrine was elected as her successor at the federal congress in August 2020 in Bielefeld.

For the 2017 federal election, Schröder stood for the FDP in 4th place on the state list in Hamburg led by Katja Suding. In addition, she prevailed within the party with her application for the direct candidacy for the FDP in the constituency of Hamburg-Eimsbüttel against Burkhardt Müller-Sönksen, who had been a member of the German Bundestag until 2013. However, she failed to enter the Bundestag.
For the election to the Hamburg Parliament 2020 Schröder was elected to place 7 of the state list of the FDP Hamburg. However, she did not succeed as the FDP did not pass the necessary 5 percent hurdle.

Member of the German Parliament, 2021–present 
For the 2021 federal election, Schröder applied for place 1 of the Hamburg state list of the FDP. She could not prevail against a total of three other candidates and was subsequently elected to list position 2 and was voted into the Bundestag.

In the 20th German Bundestag, Schröder serves as her parliamentary group's spokesperson on education policy. She is a member of the Committee for Education, Research and Technology Assessment.

In addition to her committee assignments, Schröder is part of the German Parliamentary Friendship Group for Relations with the States of South Asia.

Other activities 
 Association of Private Higher Education Institutions (VPH), Member of the Board of Trustees (since 2022)
 Stiftung Lesen, Member of the Board of Trustees (since 2022)
 German National Association for Student Affairs, Ex-Officio Member of the Board of Trustees (since 2022)
 Magnus Hirschfeld Foundation, Deputy Member of the Board of Trustees (since 2022)
 Young European Federalists (YEF), Member

Political positions 
Schröder advocates policies that are "fair to all generations". She criticized the proposal by Federal Labor Minister Hubertus Heil to set a double halfway point for pension levels and contribution rates until 2025 as "blatantly unfair to the younger generation" and "unsustainable."
Schröder is a member of the Young Pension Commission, which was formed in response to the federal government's pension commission.

Schröder calls for privatization of parts of German public broadcasting.

During the COVID-19 pandemic in Germany, she called for the removal of the bureaucratic hurdles of BAföG as an emergency aid for students in financial emergencies.

References 

1992 births
Living people
Members of the Bundestag for the Free Democratic Party (Germany)
Members of the Bundestag 2021–2025
Members of the Bundestag for Rhineland-Palatinate
21st-century German women politicians
People from Boppard